West Morris Central High School (WMCHS) is a four-year comprehensive public high school that serves students in ninth through twelfth grades from Washington Township, Morris County, New Jersey, United States. It is one of two high schools in the West Morris Regional High School District.

History 
The constituent municipalities—the Chester School District (Chester Borough / Township), Mendham Borough / Township, Mount Olive and Washington Township—approved a referendum in 1956 by a better than 7-1 margin for the construction of a high school to cost $1,961,000 (equivalent to $ million in ).

The school opened in September 1958, with 531 students in grades 9-11 in a building with 39 classrooms designed to accommodate 1200 people. The school's first hire was a biology teacher named Maria Young.

Academics

Enrollment 
As of the 2021–22 school year, the school had an enrollment of 1,084 students and 95.4 classroom teachers (on an FTE basis), for a student–teacher ratio of 11.4:1. There were 11 students (1.0% of enrollment) eligible for free lunch and none eligible for reduced-cost lunch.

Rankings
West Morris Central was the 14th-ranked public high school in New Jersey out of 339 schools statewide in New Jersey Monthly magazine's September 2018 cover story on the state's "Top Public High Schools", using a new ranking methodology. The school had been ranked 56th in the state of 328 schools in 2012, after being ranked 43rd in 2010 out of 322 schools listed. The magazine ranked the school 42nd in 2008 out of 316 schools. The school was ranked 41st in the magazine's September 2006 issue, which included 316 schools across the state.

Schooldigger.com ranked the school 92nd out of 381 public high schools statewide in its 2011 rankings (a decrease of 32 positions from the 2010 ranking) which were based on the combined percentage of students classified as proficient or above proficient on the mathematics (87.1%) and language arts literacy (96.8%) components of the High School Proficiency Assessment (HSPA).

In 2017, the Washington Post ranked WMCHS as the third most challenging public, non-charter high school in New Jersey behind West Morris Mendham HS and Princeton HS.  The school was also ranked 328th in the entire nation in the list of most challenging high schools.

In its 2013 report on "America's Best High Schools", The Daily Beast ranked the school 535th in the nation among participating public high schools and 43rd among schools in New Jersey. The school was ranked 226th in the nation and 20th in New Jersey on the list of "America's Best High Schools 2012" prepared by The Daily Beast / Newsweek, with rankings based primarily on graduation rate, matriculation rate for college and number of Advanced Placement / International Baccalaureate courses taken per student, with lesser factors based on average scores on the SAT / ACT, average AP/IB scores and the number of AP/IB courses available to students.

Awards 
History Teacher Rosanne Lichatin, was named the 2005 Preserve America History Teacher of the Year, and was recognized with the honor by First Lady Laura Bush.

Programs 
The school is accredited by the New Jersey Department of Education. The school has offered the IB Diploma Programme, as part of the International Baccalaureate Organization, since January 1998 The school was one of 17 high schools in New Jersey to offer the IB diploma program in 2021; along with its sister school West Morris Mendham, it is one of the two high schools in New Jersey to offer both the IB Diploma and Career Programs.

Extracurricular activities

Athletics
As of 2020, the school offers programs in baseball, basketball, cheerleading, fencing, women's field hockey, football, men's ice hockey, lacrosse, soccer, softball, swimming, tennis, unified sports, volleyball, wrestling, and track and field.

The school's mascots are either the Highlanders or the Wolf Pack depending on the team. School colors are Columbia blue, navy blue and gray.

Teams compete in the Northwest Jersey Athletic Conference, an athletic conference comprised of high schools located in Morris, Sussex and Warren counties, which was established following a reorganization of sports leagues in Northern New Jersey by the New Jersey State Interscholastic Athletic Association (NJSIAA). Prior to the NJSIAA's 2009 realignment, the school had been a member of the Iron Hills Conference. With 919 students in grades 10–12, the school was classified by the NJSIAA for the 2019–20 school year as Group III for most athletic competition purposes, which included schools with an enrollment of 761 to 1,058 students in that grade range. The football team competes in the Freedom Blue division of the North Jersey Super Football Conference, which includes 112 schools competing in 20 divisions, making it the nation's biggest football-only high school sports league. The school was classified by the NJSIAA as Group III North for football for 2022–2024.

Achievements 
The football team has won nine sectional championships. The team won the North II Group III state sectional championship eight times, in the 1982, 1991, 1995, 2001, 2004, 2009, 2021 and 2022 seasons, and won a North II Group IV title in 2012. The 1982 team avenged its only loss of the season with a 10–6 win in the North II Group III sectional championship game against Randolph High School to finish the season at 10–1 bringing the Wolfpack their first championship title. The 1991 team finished the season with a 10–1 record after a 14–0 win in the North II Group III state sectional championship game against Nutley High School. The 1995 again topped Nutley by a score of 21-0. The 2001 football team won the North II, Group III state championship against West Morris Mendham High School by a score of 15–14. The team won the 2004 North II, Group III state championship against West Morris Mendham by a score of 10–7. The 2009 football team won the North II, Group III state championship against Passaic Valley Regional High School by a score of 28–19. The 2012 team won the North II, Group IV against Warren Hills High School by a score of 35-7. The 2021 football team finished the season with a 10-3 record after winning the North I Group III championship against West Essex High School by a score of 21-0 and then winning the North Group III championship game—the program's first regional title—against the previously unbeaten and NJ.com's 11th-ranked football team, Cranford High School by a score of 53-14. In a rematch, the team won the North II Group III championship in 2022 with a 21-7 win against West Essex that marked the first back-to-back championships for the Wolfpack.<ref>Cohen, Todd. "West Morris football holds off West Essex to win section title for second year in a row", Daily Record, November 11, 2022. Accessed November 28, 2022. "Montella had a game-high 259 yards and two touchdowns to lift top-seeded West Morris past third-seeded West Essex in the North 2 Group 3 championship game.... The victory preserved an undefeated season and second straight sectional crown for West Morris (12-0). It’s the first time in school history the Wolfpack have won consecutive sectional crowns."</ref> The intra-district football rivalry with West Morris Mendham was ranked 23rd on NJ.com's 2017 list "Ranking the 31 fiercest rivalries in N.J. HS football". West Morris Central leads the series with an overall record of 21-7-1 through the 2017 season, including sectional finals victories in both 2001 and 2004.

The 2008-09 girls' basketball team won the Morris County Tournament by advancing to the finals and defeating top-seeded Hanover Park High School by a score of 42-32 for the championship, winning the county title for the third time in program history, having most recently won in 1993.

The field hockey team won the North I Group III state sectional championship in 2010 and 2012.

The ice hockey team won the Halvorsen Cup in 2009, 2013 and 2014, and won the Haas Cup in 2010 and 2022.

The girls' lacrosse team won the 2001 North A championship, defeating Bridgewater-Raritan High School 8–7 in the tournament final.

The boys' lacrosse team won the Group II state championship in 2007 (against Ramapo High School in the tournament final) and won the Group III title in 2016 (vs. Moorestown High School). The team won the 2007 Group II title, the program's first, with an 8–7 win against Ramapo High School in the championship game. The team won the Group III title in 2016 with an 8–7 win against Moorestown on a goal scored with seconds left in the game.

The boys' tennis team won the Group III state championship in 1990, defeating Ramapo High School in the tournament final.

The girls soccer team was the Group III state co-champion after ending in a tie with Notre Dame High School in the final game of the tournament. The team won the North II Group III state sectional title in 2011, 2013, 2015, 2021 and 2022. The team won the North II Group III state sectional championship with a 1–0 win against Somerville High School in the final game of the tournament.Knego, Lauren. "Somerville girls soccer falters in quest for sectional title", Courier News, November 12, 2015. Accessed October 31, 2019. "The second-seeded Pioneers fell to top-seeded West Morris 1-0 in the NJSIAA North 2 Group III sectional final. Somerville was looking for its first sectional title in two years, while the Wolfpack (20-1-1) won its first crown since 2013." The 2022 team won the program's first outright group championship with a 1-0 win over Wall High School in the finals of the Group II tournament.

The boys' soccer team was the 2000 Group III state co-champion, the program's first title, after playing Ocean City High School to a 0–0 tie in the title game, finishing the season with a 20-4-2 record."2000 was best ever for West Morris Central boys soccer", New Jersey Hills, January 11, 2001. Accessed November 4, 2020. "The decided underdog against defending champion Ocean City, the West Morris Highlanders held Ocean City scoreless through regulation and two overtime periods. The speedy Highlander forwards threatened to score on several occasions, but could not find the back of the net. The match ended a 0-0 tie, but was a moral victory for the unranked Highlanders.... The Highlanders had cause to celebrate a dominating 20-4-2 season, registering 18 shutouts, scoring 74 goals and allowing only 14 goals against. The Group 3 state championship was the first ever claimed by West Morris Central High School."

The 2002 girls' softball team won the North II, Group III sectional state championship, edging Cranford High School by a score of 1–0. The team won the North II Group III sectional title in 2013 with a 5–4 win in the tournament final against West Morris Mendham High School.

The women's volleyball team has won the Group III state championship in 2009 (vs. Northern Highlands Regional High School), 2012 (vs. Northern Valley Regional High School at Old Tappan) and 2018 (vs. Old Tappan). The 2009 team won the Group III state championship against Northern Highlands Regional High School, for the program's first group title in school history, in a season in which they also won the Morris County Tournament and were American Division champions in the Northwest Jersey Athletic Conference.Havsy, Jane. "West Morris reached all its goals", Daily Record, December 17, 2009. Accessed July 24, 2011. "During preseason, the West Morris volleyball players wrote their goals on the white squares of a poster made up to look like a checkered flag. West Morris lived up to all three, winning the MCT for the first time since '07, a share of the inaugural NJAC-American Division, and finally earning the first NJSIAA Group III title in school history." The 2018 team won the Morris County Tournament and the Group III championship, defeating Old Tappan in two sets — 25-18 and 25-20 — in the tournament's final match; Old Tappan had won the Group III title the three previous years."No. 16 West Morris upsets No. 3 Old Tappan to win Group 3 title (PHOTOS/VIDEO)", NJ Advance Media for NJ.com, November 10, 2018, updated August 23, 2019. Accessed November 4, 2020. "Winning the Morris County Tournament was just enough to whet West Morris' appetite for more. With Liz Gialanella amassing 16 kills, seven digs and a block and junior Sophie DeFaria coming up with 17 digs, West Morris, No. 16 in The NJ.com Top 20, was able to slake its title desires with a 25-18, 25-20 decision over No. 3 Old Tappan in the NJSIAA Group 3 final at William Paterson in Wayne." The Lady Highlanders have won the most Morris County Tournament championships, including four consecutive MCT titles from 2000 to 2003, and won 13 of the 19 titles through 2018.

The boys' wrestling team won its first ever Iron Hills-Iron title in 2006. The Wolfpack wrestlers were considered as high as number two in the Daily Record area, and was voted a top ten team in Region 1 of NJSIAA wrestling. The team was led under the guidance of Ken Rossi who was a two-time state finalist for Jefferson High School.

Clubs

The clubs at West Morris Central have included: three a capella singing groups, Academy of Science, Archery Club, Art/Photography Club, Astronomy Club, Band Front, Book Club, Bowling Club, Volleyball Club, Chess Club, Chinese Club, Choral Club, Debate Club, Diversity Club, Fall Cheerleader, Fashion Design Club, FBLA, Film Club, Future Educators, Fishing Club, Gardening Club,  Highlanders for Humanity, International/Cultural Arts Club, Intramurals,  Investment Club, Jam Club, Kick Boxing, Literary Magazine, Marching Band, Math League, National History Club, National Honor Society, Newspaper, Project Peace Anti-Bullying Club, Reach (Peer Leadersip), Red Cross, Relay for Life, School Store, Science League, Self-Defense Club, Service Learning Club, Ski Club, Sound/Lighting, Spikeball, Stage Craft, STARS, STEM (Technology Club), Student Council, Technology Club, Unified Sports Club, World Language Honor Society and Yearbook.

West Morris participates in the National Honor Society, as well as the French National Honor Society, Spanish National Honor Society and Chinese National Honor Society.

WMCHS is also home to Central Theatre, West Morris' theatre troupe. Since 2016, many productions have been nominated or won theater awards presented by the Paper Mill PlayhouseKeller, Ilana. "Paper Mill Playhouse announces Rising Star Award nominations", Asbury Park Press, May 14, 2018. Accessed April 8, 2021. and Montclair State University.

Notable alumni

 Tashy Bohm, former backstroke, freestyle and butterfly competition swimmer.
 Michael Burton (born 1992), American football fullback for the Kansas City Chiefs of the National Football League.
 Kyleigh D'Alessio (1990–2006), student at the school when her death by auto accident inspired Kyleigh's Law.
 Larry W. Maysey (1946–1967), United States Air Force pararescueman who was posthumously awarded the Air Force Cross, the Air Force's second-highest decoration (after the Medal of Honor).
 Carley Shimkus (born 1986, class of 2005), news anchor and reporter who serves as a co-host on Fox Nation, headlines reporter for Fox & Friends, and co-anchor for Fox & Friends First''
Jamie Smith (1972–1993), US Army corporal killed during the Battle of Mogadishu, subject of Black Hawk Down.
 Bill Stepien (born 1978), former Deputy Chief of Staff for Governor Chris Christie , former political director for President Donald Trump and former campaign manager for the Donald Trump 2020 presidential campaign.

See also
 West Morris Mendham High School, which serves students from Chester Borough, Chester Township, Mendham Borough and Mendham Township.

References

External links 
West Morris Central High School
West Morris Regional High School District

School Data for the West Morris Regional High School District, National Center for Education Statistics

1958 establishments in New Jersey
Educational institutions established in 1958
Washington Township, Morris County, New Jersey
International Baccalaureate schools in New Jersey
Public high schools in Morris County, New Jersey